Sophia Ming Ren Leung, CM (梁陳明任 born July 25, 1933) is a Canadian politician.

Born in Wuxi, China, she was a social worker before being elected to the House of Commons of Canada in 1997 for the riding of Vancouver-Kingsway in British Columbia. A Liberal, she was re-elected in 2000. From 2000 to 2003, she was Parliamentary Secretary to the Minister of National Revenue.  Both before and after her political career, she has been involved in a great deal of volunteer activities.

In 1994, she was made a Member of the Order of Canada.

Leung was considered for a Senate seat in 2004 and supported Sam Sullivan's bid of mayor of Vancouver.

External links
 

1933 births
Canadian social workers
Women members of the House of Commons of Canada
Chinese emigrants to Canada
Liberal Party of Canada MPs
Living people
Members of the House of Commons of Canada from British Columbia
Members of the Order of Canada
Naturalized citizens of Canada
Politicians from Wuxi
Politicians from Vancouver
Women in British Columbia politics
21st-century Canadian politicians
21st-century Canadian women politicians
Canadian politicians of Chinese descent